Philippa Duke Schuyler (August 2, 1931 – May 9, 1967) was an American concert pianist, composer, author, and journalist. A child prodigy, she was the daughter of black journalist George Schuyler and Josephine Schuyler, a white Texan heiress, Schuyler became famous in the 1930s for her talent, intellect, mixed race parentage, and the eccentric parenting methods employed by her mother.

Hailed as "the Shirley Temple of American Negroes," Schuyler performed public piano recitals and radio broadcasts by the age of four. She performed two recitals at the New York World's Fair at the age of eight. Schuyler won numerous music competitions such as the New York Philharmonic Young People's Concerts at Carnegie Hall. She became the youngest member of the National Association for American Composers and Conductors at age eleven. Schuyler encountered racism as she grew older, and had trouble coming to terms with her mixed race heritage. She later became a journalist and was killed in a helicopter crash in South Vietnam in 1967.

Life and career

Early life
Philippa Duke Schuyler was born in Harlem, New York on August 2, 1931. She was the only child of George Schuyler, a prominent black essayist and journalist, and his wife Josephine Schuyler (née Cogdell), a white Texan and one-time Mack Sennett bathing beauty and the granddaughter of slave owners. Her parents believed that intermarriage could "invigorate" both races and produce extraordinary offspring. They also advocated that mixed-race marriage could help to solve many of the social problems in the United States.

For three years before Schuyler's birth, her mother ate only natural and raw food, avoided meat, went on a body and mind preparing regime to cleanse her system in preparation to bear a "superior" child. Mrs. Schuyler further believed that genius could best be developed by a diet consisting exclusively of raw foods. As a result, Philippa grew up in her New York City apartment eating a diet predominantly comprising raw carrots, peas and yams and raw steak. She was given a daily ration of cod liver oil and lemon slices in place of sweets. "When we travel," Mrs. Schuyler said, "Philippa and I amaze waiters. You have to argue with most waiters before they will bring you raw meat. I guess it is rather unusual to see a little girl eating a raw steak."

Recognized as a prodigy at an early age, a New York Herald Tribune writer in 1933 wrote about her as the "Negro Baby." Schuyler reportedly knew the alphabet at nineteen months and was able to read and write at the age of two. By four years old she could play Schumann and Mozart compositions, and she was writing her own compositions. Her intelligence quotient (IQ) at the age of six was found to be 185.

Music career 
Schuyler's mother was an overbearing stage mother who entered her into every possible music competition. In June 1936, Schuyler won her first gold medal at the age of four at the annual tournament sponsored by the National Guild of Piano Teachers, where she performed ten original compositions. She won eight consecutive prizes from the New York Philharmonic Young People's Concerts at Carnegie Hall, then was barred from competing because the other children didn't stand a chance to win against her. She also won gold medals from the Music Education League and from the City of New York.

Schuyler's piano recitals and radio broadcasts attracted significant press coverage. New York Mayor Fiorello LaGuardia was one of Schuyler's admirers and visited her at home on more than one occasion. He declared June 19, 1940 "Philippa Duke Schuyler Day" at the New York World's Fair, where she performed two recitals. At nine, Schuyler became the subject of "Evening With A Gifted Child", a profile written by Joseph Mitchell, correspondent for The New Yorker, who heard several of her early compositions. He noted that she addressed both her parents by their first names. Schuyler completed the eighth grade at the age of eleven and by the age of fourteen she had composed 200 musical selections. She became the youngest member of the National Association for American Composers and Conductors in 1942.

By the time she reached adolescence, Schuyler was touring constantly, both in the United States and overseas. At fifteen, Schuyler graduated from Father Young S. J. Memorial High School, the Schola Cantorum of Pius X School of Liturgical Music. She also performed with the New York Philharmonic at Lewisohn Stadium. Schuyler continued her studies at Manhattanville College. Her talent as a pianist was widely acknowledged, although many critics believed that her forte lay in playing vigorous pieces and criticized her style when tackling more nuanced works. Acclaim for her performances led to her becoming a role model for many children in the United States, but Schuyler's own childhood was blighted when, during her teenage years, her parents showed her the scrapbooks they had compiled recording her life and career. The books contained numerous newspaper clippings in which both George and Josephine Schuyler commented on their beliefs and ambitions for their daughter. Realization that she had been conceived and raised, in a sense, as a genetic experiment, robbed the pianist of many of the illusions that had made her earlier youth a happy one.

In later life, Schuyler grew disillusioned with the racial and gender prejudice she encountered, particularly when performing in the United States, and much of her musical career was spent playing overseas. She fled to Latin America, where people of mixed races were more prevalent. She chose a voluntary exile of traveling and performing in Latin America, the Caribbean, Asia, Africa and Europe. She played at the inauguration of three successive presidents in Haiti. In Africa, she performed for various notables such as Haile Selassie of Ethiopia, at Independence Day celebrations for Patrice Lumumba and Joseph Kasavubu of the Congo, President Kwame Nkrumah of Ghana, and for Albert Schweitzer in his isolated leper colony in Lamberéné. She began passing for white in 1959, at first so she could travel in South Africa, then again years later thinking she would have a better career if she reentered the American concert scene as a white performer.

Journalism career 
As her concert schedule decreased in the early 1960s, Schuyler followed her father George Schuyler into journalism in her thirties. She supplemented her limited income by writing about her travels. She published more than 100 newspaper and magazine articles internationally, and was one of the few black writers for the United Press International. Schuyler published four non-fiction books: Adventures in Black and White (a biography, 1960); Who Killed the Congo? (a summary of the Belgian Congo's fight for independence, 1962); Jungle Saints (about Catholic missionaries, 1963); and Kingdom of Dreams (a quixotic study of scientific dream interpretation written with her mother, 1966).

Personal life 
Schuyler's personal life was frequently unhappy since childhood. Her mother punished her severely with whippings, and she never made friends because she did not attend school regularly. When she did attend school, she was ahead of other children her age, and was usually the only minority.

Schuyler developed an inferiority complex about her race and viewed her blackness as a "stigma". Schuyler rejected many of her parents' values and viewed their interracial marriage as a mistake. She increasingly became a vocal feminist and made many attempts to pass herself off as a woman of Ibero-American descent named Felipa Monterro y Schuyler.

Although Schuyler engaged in a number of affairs, she never married. In 1965, she endured a dangerous late-term abortion in Tijuana after an affair with Ghanaian diplomat Georges Apedo-Amah, because she did not want to have a child with a black man. Schuyler wanted to marry an Aryan man to boost her career and produce offspring she deemed ideal.

Schuyler and her father were members of the John Birch Society. In addition to her native English language, she spoke French, Italian, Spanish, Portuguese, and German. She was also a devout Catholic.

Death
In 1966, Schuyler traveled to South Vietnam to perform for the troops and Vietnamese groups. She returned in April 1967 as a war correspondent for William Loeb's Manchester Union Leader and served as a lay missionary. On May 9, 1967, Schuyler was killed in a crash of a United States Army helicopter during a mission in Da Nang to evacuate Vietnamese orphans. The helicopter crashed into Danang Bay. While she survived the crash impact, her inability to swim caused her to drown. Schuyler had planned to leave Vietnam a few days prior, but she extended her stay to bring Catholic children from Hue, where there was tension between Catholic and Buddhist factions. 2,000 mourners attended her funeral at St. Patrick's Cathedral in New York City on May 18, 1967. She was the second of two American women journalists to die in Vietnam.

A court of inquiry found that the pilot had deliberately cut his motor and descended in an uncontrolled glide – possibly in an attempt to give his civilian passengers an insight into the dangers of flying in a combat zone – eventually losing control of the aircraft.

Schuyler's mother was profoundly affected by her death and committed suicide a few days before the second anniversary of her death in 1969.

Legacy
Schuyler's parents established the Philippa Schuyler Memorial Foundation in her memory.

Philippa Schuyler Middle School for the Gifted and Talented in Bushwick, Brooklyn, New York is dedicated to preserving the memory of the child prodigy by offering an arts-focused education to New York City children.

It was reported in 2004 that Halle Berry owned the film rights to Schuyler's biography. Berry intended to co-produce the biopic with Marc Platt, starring Alicia Keys as Schuyler.

Books

Philippa Duke Schuyler, Adventures in Black and White, with foreword by Deems Taylor, (New York:  R. Speller, 1960)
Philippa Duke Schuyler, Who Killed the Congo?, (New York:  Devin-Adair, 1962)
Philippa Duke Schuyler, Jungle Saints: Africa's Heroic Catholic Missionaries, (Roma:  Verlag Herder, 1963)
Philippa Duke Schuyler and Josephine Schuyler, Kingdom of Dreams, (New York:  R. Speller, 1966)
Philippa Duke Schuyler, Good Men Die, (New York:  Twin Circle, 1969)

See also
 List of journalists killed and missing in the Vietnam War

References

Sources
Daniel McNeil, "Black devils, white saints & mixed-race femme fatales: Philippa Schuyler and the soundbites of the sixties", in Critical Arts: A Journal of South-North Cultural Studies, 2011.
Daniel McNeil, Sex and Race in the Black Atlantic (New York, Routledge, 2009). 
Joseph Mitchell, "Evening With a Gifted Child", in McSorley's Wonderful Saloon (New York: Duell, Sloan and Pearce, 1943)
Josephine Schuyler, Philippa, the Beautiful American: The Traveled History of a Troubadour, (paperback, n.p., 1969)
Kathryn Talalay, Composition In Black and White: The Tragic Saga of Harlem's Biracial Prodigy (New York: Oxford University Press, 1995)

External links
Philippa Schuyler on All Music
Philippa Schuyler Papers at Syracuse University

1931 births
1967 deaths
African-American classical composers
American classical composers
African-American classical pianists
African-American women classical composers
American women classical composers
American classical pianists
Child classical musicians
American child musicians
Women war correspondents
Journalists killed while covering the Vietnam War
Victims of aviation accidents or incidents in 1967
Victims of aviation accidents or incidents in Vietnam
Victims of helicopter accidents or incidents
American women in the Vietnam War
Women in warfare post-1945
Delta Sigma Theta members
American women journalists
20th-century American women writers
20th-century classical composers
20th-century classical pianists
20th-century American writers
American feminists
African-American journalists
American women classical pianists
20th-century American women pianists
African-American women journalists
20th-century American pianists
20th-century American composers
African-American women writers
John Birch Society members
Manhattanville College alumni
20th-century women composers
African-American Roman Catholicism
American Roman Catholic religious writers
Catholic music
African-American Catholics
Black conservatism in the United States
African-American women musicians